The Botanical garden of Upper Brittany is a private estate with an area of , located in the Ille-et-Vilaine department of Brittany, near the medieval city of Fougères. The park is part of the estate of La Foltière, where stands the Château de la Foltière, and was built in 1847.

Location 

History 
 is the name of the estate, which means "ground where beech trees grow", the word  being ancient French for "beech tree".
The park was created in 1847, around the Château de la Foltière. In 1796 the old manor house was the headquarters of an uprising against the government of the French Republic led by Count Joseph de Puisaye. In 1820, the Estate of La Foltière was bought by the family Frontin des Buffards. In 1847, the land surrounding the pond in the park was redesigned as an English romantic landscape garden, with winding paths that follow the terrain, and a view from the lawn in front of the house to the church tower in the village.

The gardens 

 
 

The botanical park is made up of three parts :

The Arcadia Gardens 
The first part : Arcadia refers to classical antiquity and the youthfulness of the garden.
 The path of white pearls. This pathway is made up of five separate enclosures for which the gardener has composed five maxims. These emphasis the qualities he deems essential in the composition of a garden and where species from the five continents have been planted.
 The 1001 nights garden, inspired by Moorish water gardens, is the first garden one comes across on entering the park. A canal with fountains runs through the garden. At the far end are three cypress trees and on either side luxuriant vegetation including jasmine, damask roses and daphnes. Our senses are lulled by the music of running water, the heady perfume and beautiful colours of the exotic flowers.
 The city of antiquity evokes a journey around the Mediterranean. An archaeological site is represented by three central quadrants lined on either side by rows of juniper trees, and columns covered with climbing roses complete the scene. The fourth quadrant has retained its original function as a vegetable garden. And like a frieze enhancing a green dominated landscape, flower beds of hardy perennials surround the antique city.
 The city of Knossos, backs on to the walls of the city of Antiquity. The labyrinth is composed of a collection of 480 varieties of Camellia. The variety sinesis or "Chinese tea" flowers from around mid-September. Next comes Camellia sansanqua in early October and then Camellia japonica. March is the best time to discover the full range. At the end of the maze a minotaur awaits the children.
 Bamboo grove, a maze of bamboo which ends at a pond planted with lotuses (which flower at the end of summer) and in the middle of which are three pyramids covered with miniature bamboo.
 The secret garden, access to which is via an impressive and ornate staircase, is inspired by the humanistic ideal of the Italian Renaissance. It revives the "Secret Garden", vegetal parlour concept inherited from mediaeval tradition.
 The ancient rose walk relates the starting story from the first rose bushes known in antiquity down to those at the beginning of the 20th century—mysterious and complicated hybridizations. A story illustrated by the natural grace of these bushes, the beauty of their flowers and their delicate perfume.
 Dionysus' garden. Here one sees a combination of shrubs and perennials. Vines bring a lighter touch to the linear fencing at the entrance to the garden.
 Robinson labyrinth, where children love getting lost in a mage of greenery.
 The garden of Olympus. Four circles evoke the twelve gods and goddesses of Mount Olympus and the daughters of Zeus: the twelve hours, the nine Muses and the three graces. Opposite Mount Olympus one can see the box which Zeus gave to Pandora.
 The prehistoric garden. This garden is an evocation of the flora existent during the Cretaceous era over 100 million years ago and before dinosaurs disappeared. It explains the evolution of plant life.

The Romantic Gardens 

The second part represents maturity and plenitude - construction of the manor house and development and perfection of the gardens. Here is a romantic landscape garden where dreams and exoticism are part of everyday life.
 The garden of the Rising Sun. A gentle combination of mineral, aquatic and vegetal. In this locality, lulled by the music of a waterfall, only abstract beauty counts—that of plants and stones. The trees are works of art, constantly changing form by pruning. Three aspects of traditional Japanese gardens are evoked here: the walking garden, the Zen garden and the tea garden.
 Copse "Decisif". Six yew trees planted two by two to form a triangle.
 The garden of exotic fragrances where species from far afield can be found, such as richeas.
 The garden of the blue spring. Set around a pond, this garden is composed solely of blue flowers but with an infinite variety of shades- symbol of eternal love.
 The carnivores' den. This marshy area is inhabited by fascinating insect-eating plants, venus fly-traps and others.
 The garden of the four seasons is situated opposite the manor house. There are four flower beds, one for each season.
 The modern rose path which is lined with beautiful modern rose bushes.

The Twilight Gardens 

The third part offers a timeless composition which represents the development of the garden, old age and twilight of life.
 The evening resting place contains a collection of mountain laurel and moschata roses. A central tetraplyon offers views of the adjacent gardens.
 The starry nights garden. This garden is tucked away in the clearing of the "little wood of confidences". Here the plants have black leaves and delicate yellow petals.
 The garden of dreams on a summer evening. Three enclosures display collections of agapanthes, crocosmias, echinaceas and peonies planted in small square boxes.
 The garden of the April moon. Peonies and shrubs with leaves which flush scarlet in the autumn are to be found in this garden.
 The sunset garden, mirror of the north facade of the chateau, this garden benefits from the last rays of light before the sun sets. A curved flower bed contains plants which flower a vivid yellow.
 The garden of the old oak tree which is dominated by the presence of a three-hundred-year-old oak tree.

Quality label 

The French Ministry of Tourism awarded the botanical garden the label  in 2011.

References

External links
 Parc botanique de Haute-Bretagne
 Parc botanique de Haute-Bretagne
 Château de la Foltiere
 Gardenvisit

Landscape
Gardens in Brittany
Botanical gardens in France
Gardens in Ille-et-Vilaine